Helvetios is the fifth studio album by Swiss folk metal band Eluveitie. The album was released 10 February 2012 through Nuclear Blast. The CD was recorded at New Sound Studio in Pfäffikon, a municipality in the canton of Schwyz in Switzerland, with producer Tommy Vetterli. It was the last album to include violinist Meri Tadić and guitarist Simeon Koch.

Concept
Being the band's  first concept album, it focuses on the Gallic Wars from a perspective of the ancient Helvetians.

Style
The album features melodic death metal combined with Celtic folk music instruments like fiddle, hurdy-gurdy, flutes, whistles, bagpipes, mandola, bodhran, and hammered dulcimer. Band member Anna Murphy has been more involved in songwriting and has been given more vocal parts than on previous releases.

Reception

Helvetios received favourable professional reviews in Germany with the Sonic Seducer magazine calling the album "pure efficiency (pure Effizienz)." The German edition of Metal Hammer lauded the tracks "Meet The Enemy",  "Neverland" and "The Siege" for their aggressive Metal style and concluded that Eluveitie's musical virtues were being continued on this album. A review by the Austrian Stormbringer compared the track "The Siege" to Sepultura's style and called the album a "piece of art."

Chart performance
The album reached the top ten album charts in Switzerland and the Top Heatseekers of the United States.

Track listing

Personnel

Eluveitie
 Chrigel Glanzmann – harsh vocals, harp, tin & low whistle, uilleann pipes, mandola, bodhrán
 Anna Murphy – clean vocals, harsh vocals in "The Siege" and "Meet the Enemy", hurdy-gurdy
 Kay Brem – bass guitar, Caesar's voice in "Havoc"
 Ivo Henzi – rhythm guitar
 Simeon Koch – lead guitar, mandola
 Patrick "Päde" Kistler – bagpipes, whistles
 Merlin Sutter – drums
 Meri Tadić – fiddles

Guests
 Alexander Morton – voice in the narrations of tracks 1, 11 & 17
 Nina Macchi – recorder in track 12
 Christoph Pelgen – gwerz vocals in track 6
 Fredy Schnyder – hammered dulcimer in tracks 4 & 7
 Sarah Wauquiez – zugerörgeli (helvetic accordion) in track 3

References

2012 albums
Eluveitie albums
Nuclear Blast albums
Concept albums